Crassispira discors is a species of sea snail, a marine gastropod mollusk in the family Pseudomelatomidae.

Description
The length of the shell attains 35 mm.

Distribution
This marine species occurs from the Sea of Cortez, Western Mexico to Ecuador

References

 G.B. Sowberby I. Proc. Geol. Soc., 1833, p. 137

External links
  W.H. Dall (1909),  Report on the collection of shells from Peru ;Proceedings of the United States National Museum, Vol. 37, pages 147-294, with Plates 20—28
 Biolib.cz: Crassispira discors
 
 

discors
Gastropods described in 1834